Gerolsbach is a municipality in the district of Pfaffenhofen in Bavaria in Germany.

References

Pfaffenhofen (district)